Futures of Education is a global initiative, launched in 2019, and led by UNESCO (United Nation Educational, Scientific and Cultural Organization) which aims to rethink and shape the future of education. The project's stated goal is to mobilize collective intelligence, generate debate and reimagine how education can contribute to the common good of humanity.

Context 
UNESCO argues that due to accelerated climate change, the fragility of Earth is becoming more apparent and that inequalities, social fragmentation, and political extremism are bringing many societies to a point of crisis. It argues that advances in digital communication, artificial intelligence, and biotechnology have potential but raise ethical and governance concerns, especially as innovation and technological change have an uneven record of contributing to human development.

UNESCO's initiative 
UNESCO's Futures of Education initiative is intended to mobilize the many ways of being and knowing to leverage humanity's collective intelligence. It relies on a consultative process that involves young people, educators, civil society, governments, business and other stakeholders. The mobilization and contribution of the network of UNITWIN/UNESCO chairs is a key part of the process of engagement. The work is being guided by an international commission of leaders from diverse fields and different regions of the world. The commission published a report on its findings in 2021.

See also 
 Education for sustainable development
 Global citizenship education
 Sustainable development

References

Sources 

UNESCO
Educational programs
2019 establishments